Thirty Acres is a novel by Canadian writer Philippe Panneton, published under the pen name Ringuet. First published in French in 1938, it was published in an English translation in 1940 and won the Governor General's Award for Fiction at the 1940 Governor General's Awards. It is considered one of the most important works in Quebec literature, and one of the most important exemplars of the roman du terroir genre.

The novel traces the life of Euchariste Moisan, a rural farmer in Quebec.

The novel's English edition remains in print as part of the New Canadian Library series.

References

External links
 

1938 Canadian novels
Governor General's Award-winning fiction books
Canadian French-language novels
New Canadian Library